Teppo Kalevi Numminen (born July 3, 1968) is a Finnish former professional ice hockey defenceman who played in the National Hockey League (NHL). He played for Tappara and TuTo of the SM-liiga and the Winnipeg Jets, Phoenix Coyotes, Dallas Stars and Buffalo Sabres of the National Hockey League (NHL).

Playing career

Numminen started his career with his local team, Tappara, in the SM-liiga. Drafted in the second round (twenty-ninth overall) in the 1986 NHL Entry Draft by the Winnipeg Jets, Numminen moved to North America in 1988 to play for the Jets. He moved with the team as it became the Phoenix Coyotes before the 1996–97 season. He played in the NHL All-Star Game in 1999, 2000 and 2001. After fifteen seasons playing for the Winnipeg/Phoenix organization, Numminen was traded to the Dallas Stars in July 2003, for Mike Sillinger. Numminen took a break from hockey during the 2004–05 NHL lockout, then signed as a free agent with the Buffalo Sabres.

On November 13, 2006, Numminen played his 1,252nd game in the NHL, thus setting a record for most NHL games played by a European-trained player, surpassing Jari Kurri.

After signing a one-year contract for the 2007–08 season, Numminen was forced to undergo open heart surgery before the start of the season. Numminen was suspended by the Sabres when it was discovered he needed heart surgery. Sabres' general manager Darcy Regier stated the suspension was because his $2.6 million contract was not insured, and the contract contained a clause, which stated that player must have passed the physical and had to be fit to play.

Word came that Numminen's heart surgery was successful. Completed on September 20, 2007, at the Cleveland Clinic, the surgery was performed to repair a faulty valve. Numminen was able to return to action for the final game of the Sabres' 2007–08 season on April 5, 2008.

Per a statement by general manager Regier, Numminen expressed some interest in returning to NHL play for at least another year. On August 8, 2008, Numminen re-signed with the Buffalo Sabres.

He was the leader among active NHL players who played the most games without winning the Stanley Cup: 1,372 at the end of the 2008-09 season.

Numminen announced his retirement on August 4, 2009. The 41-year-old finished his NHL career with 117 goals and 520 assists for 637 points in 1372 NHL games. At the time of his retirement, Numminen was the last player from the 1986 NHL Entry Draft still playing in the NHL and he had extended his record to 1,372 NHL games, the most by a European-born and trained player at any position, which stood until broken by Nicklas Lidström in the 2009–10 season.

On January 30, 2010, the Coyotes enshrined Numminen's number 27 jersey into the ring of honor. During his 15 seasons for the franchise, including their previous incarnation as the Winnipeg Jets, he played 1,098 games, a then franchise record. His 534 points are also a franchise record for defencemen.

International play
Numminen represented the Finnish men's national team and won two silver medals in 1988 and 2006, and one bronze medal in 1998 Winter Olympics.

Other activities

Numminen used to own 80% of Montreal Sports Ltd, which was a company founded by his father, Kalevi. The company produced ice hockey sticks and equipment and was sold to the large hockey brand Warrior.

Personal life
Numminen and his wife Ann-Maarit have two daughters, Bianca and Erica, and one son, Nicklas. His brother, center Teemu Numminen (born December 23, 1973) was drafted 229th overall in the 1992 NHL Entry Draft by the Winnipeg Jets but he never made it to the NHL.

Career statistics

Regular season and playoffs

International

See also
 List of NHL players with 1000 games played

References

External links

 
 Teppo Numminen - Sabres.com

1968 births
Living people
Buffalo Sabres coaches
Buffalo Sabres players
Dallas Stars players
Finnish ice hockey defencemen
Ice hockey players at the 1988 Winter Olympics
Ice hockey players at the 1998 Winter Olympics
Ice hockey players at the 2002 Winter Olympics
Ice hockey players at the 2006 Winter Olympics
IIHF Hall of Fame inductees
Medalists at the 1988 Winter Olympics
Medalists at the 1998 Winter Olympics
Medalists at the 2006 Winter Olympics
National Hockey League All-Stars
National Hockey League players with retired numbers
Olympic bronze medalists for Finland
Olympic ice hockey players of Finland
Olympic medalists in ice hockey
Olympic silver medalists for Finland
Phoenix Coyotes players
Ice hockey people from Tampere
Tappara players
TuTo players
Winnipeg Jets (1979–1996) draft picks
Winnipeg Jets (1979–1996) players